Hiroyuki Nagao (born August 28, 1980 in Yokohama) is a Japanese slalom canoeist who competed at the international level from 2003 to 2011. He was eliminated in the semifinals of the C2 event at the 2008 Summer Olympics in Beijing, finishing in 9th place.

His partner in the C2 boat from 2007 to 2011 was Masatoshi Sanma.

World Cup individual podiums

1 Asia Canoe Slalom Championship counting for World Cup points

References

1980 births
Canoeists at the 2008 Summer Olympics
Japanese male canoeists
Living people
Olympic canoeists of Japan
Canoeists at the 2010 Asian Games
Asian Games competitors for Japan